Kristyn Wong-Tam  (born ) is a Canadian politician who has represented Toronto Centre in the Legislative Assembly of Ontario since 2022 as a member of the Ontario New Democratic Party (NDP).

They served on Toronto City Council from 2010 to 2022. Wong-Tam was first elected in 2010 Toronto election in Ward 27 Toronto Centre-Rosedale, and was subsequently re-elected following the 2014 election and 2018 election in the newly created Ward 13 Toronto Centre. Wong-Tam resigned as a Toronto city councillor on May 4, 2022, to run as the NDP candidate in Toronto Centre for the June 2022 provincial election.

Early life and work
Born in Hong Kong and raised in a Buddhist family, they immigrated to Toronto with their family in 1975. They grew up in the Regent Park neighbourhood of Toronto, with their family settling there first before a move to the suburbs. A real estate agent and business owner, they are the former owner of a Timothy's franchise in Toronto's Church and Wellesley Village, and the owner of the KWT (formerly the XEXE) contemporary art gallery at Bathurst and Richmond Street West. They are non-binary and use they/them pronouns.

Activism
Wong-Tam, who is a Canadian of Chinese origin, came out as a lesbian in high school, at the age of 16 and has been an activist for both LGBTQ and Asian Canadian community issues, serving on the Chinese Canadian National Council and helping to found Asian Canadians For Equal Marriage and the Church and Wellesley Village's business improvement area. In 2011, they cooperated with Toronto's Lesbian Gay Bi Trans Youth Line to create an award, named in memory of Toronto artist Will Munro, to honour LGBT youth involved in community arts projects in Ontario.

Prior to the 2010 Toronto municipal election, it emerged that Wong-Tam had provided support for the political advocacy group Queers Against Israeli Apartheid (QuAIA).  In an interview with the Toronto Sun newspaper, they said that they lent their credit card to register the group's website because no one in the group owned a credit card. Wong-Tam "listed their home address in the registration but gave the contact number as her Coldwell Banker real estate office on Yonge St."  Wong-Tam was the registered owner of the site until August 31, 2010.

Political career

Rookie councillor (2010–2014) 
In the 2010 election, Wong-Tam ran in Ward 27 to replace Kyle Rae who had chosen to retire, defeating opponent Ken Chan in the heated race by just 400 plus votes.

They were endorsed by the Toronto and York Labour Council, neighbouring councillor Adam Vaughan, street nurse Cathy Crowe and author Michele Landsberg.

In a post-election interview with the Toronto Sun, Wong-Tam said that they are "really looking forward to working with the Mayor" and that they support Mayor Rob Ford's campaign pledge to scrap the personal vehicle tax and the land transfer tax. Wong-Tam also noted that they did not renew their New Democratic Party membership, saying: "I think all (council) rookies are saying the same thing – they don't want to be pigeon-holed."

Second term (2014–2018) 
Wong-Tam was re-elected in Ward 27 in 2014.

Third run and new ward boundaries (2018–2022) 
In the lead up to the 2018 Toronto municipal election, City Council approved a redrawing of municipal ward boundaries, increasing its size from 44, after an independent consultant recommended the city adopt a 47 ward system. However, the Ontario government under Progressive Conservative Premier Doug Ford amended the Municipal Elections Act, forcing the City of Toronto to cut the number of wards from 47 to 25. There was swift reaction regarding this move from various council members, including Wong-Tam, who called the move "extremely anti-democratic" and described it "as a takeover of Toronto." Wong-Tam said in an interview "This greater concentration of power does not give and deliver better government", and "He [Ford] will speak in populist platitudes about saving taxpayer dollars, but it's going to come at the cost of the erosion of the democratic process."

Provincial politics 
On April 8, 2022, Wong-Tam and Ontario NDP leader Andrea Horwath announced that Wong-Tam would be the party's candidate in Toronto Centre in the June 2 election. Wong-Tam resigned from their council seat effective May 4. They won the Toronto Centre seat by more than 2,000 votes.

Election results

References

External links

1971 births
Living people
Businesspeople from Toronto
Canadian Buddhists
LGBT municipal councillors in Canada
Canadian real estate agents
Women municipal councillors in Canada
Canadian women in business
Hong Kong emigrants to Canada
Hong Kong LGBT politicians
Lesbian politicians
Toronto city councillors
Women in Ontario politics
LGBT Buddhists
Ontario New Democratic Party MPPs
Canadian LGBT people in provincial and territorial legislatures
Non-binary politicians
21st-century Canadian LGBT people